Saif al-Mulūk and Badīʿ al-Jamāl was a later addition to the One Thousand and One Nights collection of Arabic fables. It has been translated into numerous languages such as Balochi, Bengali, English, Hindustani Persian and Punjabi.

Saiful Malook was a prince of Egypt. He had a handsome amount of treasure which he inherited from his forefathers. Inscribed on the treasure were two seals; one bearing the image of Saif ul Muluk 
and the other one being that of Badi-ul-Jamala. One night, Prince Saiful Malook dreamt of a lake and a fairy. He got up and went to his father. He told him about his dream of the beautiful fairy and lake. He instantly fell in love with the fairy. He asked his father, How can I find this fairy? How can I be with her? His father told him that he is human and she isn’t, the meeting is not possible.

Punjab
It is also a classic fable from the Hazara region of Pakistan. The story of love between a prince and a fairy was translated by 19th-century mystic poet of Punjabi literature Mian Muhammad Bakhsh in poetry form. The Saiful Malook lake in northern Pakistan, regarded as one of the most beautiful lakes in Pakistan, may have been named after it.

References 

Fables
Pakistani folklore
Pakistani fairy tales
1870 books